Chapman Memorial Field  is a privately owned public-use airport located two nautical miles (4 km) southwest of the central business district of Centerburg, in Knox County, Ohio, United States.

Facilities and aircraft 
Chapman Memorial Field covers an area of 40 acres (16 ha) at an elevation of 1,180 feet (360 m) above mean sea level. It has one runway designated 9/27 with a turf surface measuring 3,200 by 80 feet (975 x 24 m).

For the 12-month period ending April 8, 2010, the airport had 4,000 general aviation aircraft operations, an average of 10 per day. At that time there were 32 aircraft based at this airport: 75% single-engine, 6% multi-engine and 19% ultralight.

References

External links 
 Aerial image as of 15 March 1995 from USGS The National Map

Airports in Ohio
Transportation in Knox County, Ohio